The Fremont-Winema National Forest of south central Oregon is a mountainous region with a rich geological, ecological, archaeological, and historical history. Founded in 1908, the Fremont National Forest was originally protected as the Goose Lake Forest Reserve in 1906. The name was soon changed to Fremont National Forest, named after John C. Frémont, who explored the area for the United States Army Corps of Engineers in 1843. It absorbed part of Paulina National Forest on July 19, 1915. In 2002, it was administratively combined with the Winema National Forest as the Fremont–Winema National Forests.

Geography 
The Fremont National Forest is the eastern portion of the Fremont-Winema National Forest, which combined comprises a significant portion of south-central Oregon. Yamsay Mountain is located in the extreme north-northwest of the forest region. The Winema portion includes Crater Lake and the eastern slopes of the Cascade Mountains. The Fremont portion includes an area that begins on the shores of Klamath Marsh in the west, Hagger Mountain in the north, Winter Rim on the east, and down to the California border between near Lakeview, Oregon. This area of Oregon region is nicknamed the ‘pumice plains’, referring to the area having borne the brunt of tephra deposition during the eruption of Mount Mazama (Crater Lake) in 7,620 BP.

The climate is significantly drier on the east side of the Cascades, resulting in a rainshadow effect. This difference in precipitation between the lower and higher elevations of forested areas spans two Köppen climate classifications. The majority of the Fremont is Csb: warm summer Mediterranean, whereas elevations of 7,000 feet and higher are designated as Dsc: dry summer subarctic, (Climate Data.org 2016). Precipitation primarily in the form of winter rains and snow pack feed watersheds that include perennial and annual creeks, fen marshes, and small lakes. Perennial rivers include the Chewaucan, Sprague, Williamson, and Sycan. Generally the landscape is relatively flat and rolling, although there are some high peaks that include Yamsay Mountain at 8,196 feet above sea level, and 8,370 foot Gearhart Mountain. Both are volcanic in origin but formed during events separate from what formed the nearby Cascade Range.

Geology 
The volcanoes of the Fremont Forest are typically older than the Cascades and were a result of tectonic shearing stretching the crust thin which allowed mantle magma to emerge at the surface. Crustal stretching continued through the late Miocene resulting in uplifted fault blocking of what was flat basalt landscapes, creating into towering scarp- mountains that are gently sloped on one side and terminate into a sharp scarp face on the other. The east portion of the Fremont Forest region is like this, sloping to the west and terminating in a sheer scarp face along the Summer Lake sub-basin.

Archaeological & ethnographic history 

Human presence in the Fremont region extends back thousands of years. Physical evidence of this comes from the Paisley Caves (location of the discovery of a 14,500 year old human coprolite) Fort Rock Cave (the location of the now famous ‘oldest shoes in the world’ sagebrush sandals), and more recently, Connolly Caves (where bison remains and delicate Ice Age bone needles have been found and dated to well over 10k years old). These sites are within 10 to 20 miles from the Fremont Forest boundary. Further archaeological evidence of later human activity can be found at Carlon Village and Picture Rock Pass, and many more smaller house rings and artifact scatters throughout the area. Through clear cultural relationships seen in the artifact record, as well as legends and oral knowledge tying them to this place, the decedents of these early people are the Klamath. The Paiute and Modoc also have a long and rich cultural connection to the Fremont Forest.

Native people were quickly moved out of their traditional territories through the late 1800s into the mid-1900s as a response to Euro-American settlers in the region that were attracted to rich forest resources and ranching possibilities. The exception was Yamsay Mountain which remained part of the 1901 Klamath Reservation until 1911 when it became listed as part of the Paulina National Forest and was later ceded to the Fremont National Forest in 1913. The Klamath tried to recover their previous lands, but in 1954 the Klamath Termination Act meant that the tribe's remaining 525,700 acres of former Indian reservation lands, almost all within the Fremont Forest region, were placed under National Forest administration under the 1953 House Concurrent Resolution 108 (HCR-108). Klamath tribal designation was restored in 1986 [1].

Euro-American arrival 
Euro-American traders began entering the Klamath area at some point between 1825 and 1827, where they worked as trappers for the Hudson's Bay Company. The Fremont National Forest was established in 1908 and was named for Captain John C. Fremont, who was sent to explore the area in 1843. After trade routes inland and to the Pacific were opened up in 1846, Fort Klamath was built in 1863 and the Klamath reservation was established. In the beginning the Klamath were able to keep Yamsay Mountain in their territory, but vast economic opportunities present was too much for the federal government to resist. Trappers may have begun the early movements of Euro-Americans into the area, but it was the harvesting of old growth ponderosa pine timber that was the real draw later in the 19th century. Ecological damage done by excessive logging was exacerbated by the introduction of sheep and cattle ranching, complete fire suppression, and other activities which remain visible on the landscape to this day.

Ecology 

The Fremont Forest region is listed as part of the Mazama ecoregion due to high amounts of Mazama tephra covering the landscape as a result of its catastrophic eruption 7,620 years ago that resulted in the formation of Crater Lake. Fremont ecology is at once fragile and robust, with dominant trees including ponderosa and lodgepole pines, juniper, willow in wetter areas, and occasional firs in some higher elevations as well as over 925 vascular plant species. Examples of herbaceous plants and shrubs include Nootka rose, biscuit root, bitterroot, ipos (wild carrot), gooseberries, service berries, wild strawberries, lily bulbs, and, in wetter areas, camas, wokus (yellow pond lily), and cattails. The Fremont area differs from the Winema area in that it has slightly less tree diversity. This is due to two primary factors: the Cinema encompasses a greater elevation range, and receives more precipitation, due to its location on the east slopes of the Cascades, which provides alpine and subalpine environments.

Fauna includes deer, elk, black bears, coyotes, badgers, many types of rodents, jackrabbits and rabbits, cougars, bobcats, porcupines, Reptiles and amphibians. Endangered endemic fauna includes the Larch Mountain salamander (Plethodon larselli), a rare, lungless amphibian that lives on steep talus slopes. Golden and bald eagles are permanent fixtures, as well as hawks, herons, sandhill cranes, and many migratory birds that move along the Pacific flyway.

Fire ecology 

Fire is a necessary component to the health and structure of a meso-xeric landscape forest structure. State, federal, and tribal land managers recognize this and are moving research and implementation of fire regimes along quickly in order to minimize possible future threats to forest, water resources, human health and properties.

An assessment of prehistoric forest composition will be of benefit to understanding how climate change might affect future forest structure and thus, better informed management. The genera described below are primary forest structure trees as listed by which trees make up the primary composition of the Fremont forest. This list comes from a combination of primary literature that includes academic studies as well as forestry reports and genera surveys.

Forest zones east of the Cascades are generally defined as being Rocky Mountain forest types. The Fremont is on the boundary of the floristic Great Basin and reflects this with the presence of typical Great Basin flora, including sagebrush (Artemisia sp.) and bitterbrush (Purshia sp.). The dominant conifer species is ponderosa pine (Pinus ponderosa). Current ecological structures are the result of 100 years of fire suppression.

Shrub-steppe flora of the Basin and Range mix with ponderosa pine communities. Fire is a natural and regular occurrence in this region, which is reflected in the flora and fauna evolved to make use of cyclical fire regimes and species distributions are rapidly affected depending on the presence or lack of fire cycles.

Tree species of Fremont National Forest

Balance between fire suppression and prescribed burning 
The suppression of fire for the last 100 years within the Fremont has resulted in an increase in fuel loads that lead to too hot forest fires that kill the plants evolved to depend on recurrent fire or create stands of shade-tolerant trees replacing shade-intolerant species, thus altering the structure of the ecosystem. This stand structures can lead to more intense fires, given the right fuel moisture and wind conditions, due to an increase in understory and smaller trees growing closer together. This may also increase susceptibility to disease and insect outbreaks. These results have led to loss of natural diversity, and an increased risk of severe fires threatening homes and lives. Prescribed fires reducing fuel loads beneath existing stands of ponderosa pine have proven useful in reducing the potential threat of wildfires, while also favoring natural regeneration of seral species in many places.  However, prescribed fires can lead to the loss of volatile nutrients from burn site, particularly nitrogen.

References

External links
Official Fremont–Winema National Forest website

.
Former National Forests of Oregon
John C. Frémont
Protected areas of Klamath County, Oregon
Protected areas of Lake County, Oregon
Superfund sites in Oregon
Protected areas established in 1906
1906 establishments in Oregon
2002 disestablishments in Oregon